Fenon Events is an events management firm in Kampala, Uganda, that is part of Fenon Entertainment.

History
The company was founded in 2004. It has since organised a number of events in Uganda ranging from music concerts, branding events as well as corporate events. It has organised events like "Superbrands", "Club mega fest", and Busy Signal's concert in Uganda.

References

External links 

Event management companies of Uganda
Kumusha